Gloom 3 (also known as Ultimate Gloom and Gloom 3: Zombie Edition) is a video game for the Amiga computer, released in 1997. Gloom 3 was the third proper, commercially released clone of the first-person shooter Doom in the Gloom series on the Amiga.

Gloom 3s author, Gareth Murfin, was proprietor of Alpha Software, with additional graphics made by James Caygill and Jason Jordache.

The game was one of two games produced by Alpha Software for the Amiga, the other being Zombie Massacre, at a time when the machine was less popular. Although the game was critically well received by publications such as CU Amiga, at the time of release games for the Amiga were on the decline and not deemed commercially viable, and the game received criticism for its appearance.

Despite the "3" in the title, this is actually the second game in the Gloom series, as there is no such game as Gloom 2. According to one of the people who worked on this game, the reason for the game being called "Gloom 3" was because he confused Gloom Deluxe for Gloom 2, even though Gloom Deluxe was actually an updated version of the first game, not a sequel.

References

External links
Gloom 3 at the Amiga Hall of Light
Gloom 3 at Lemon Amiga

1997 video games
Amiga games
Amiga-only games
Amiga 1200 games
Video game clones
Video games developed in the United Kingdom
Video games about zombies
Video games with 2.5D graphics
First-person shooters
Sprite-based first-person shooters